The Missoula Timberjacks represented Missoula, Montana, in the Class C level Pioneer League from 1956 to 1960.  Previously, Missoula played as members of the Montana State League (1892, 1905, 1925) and Union Association (1911–1913). Their best season was 1958 when they went 70–59 under manager Jack McKeon and had Jim Kaat on the roster.

The Missoula Timberjacks were an affiliate of the Washington Senators (1957–1959) and Cincinnati Reds (1960).

Baseball Hall of Fame members Clark Griffith and Jim Kaat played for Missoula.

History
The Timberjacks were preceded by Missoula teams in the Montana State League (1892, 1905, 1925) and Union Association (1911–1913).

Missoula first began minor league play as charter members of the 1892 Montana State League. The 1892 Montana State League was six–team Class B league. The league played a split season. The Bozeman and Great Falls franchises disbanded on July 23, 1892, after the conclusion of the first half. The overall standings were Helena (29–21), Butte (26–22), Missoula (18–29) and Philipsburg (22–23). Bozeman had a record of 10–8 and the Great Falls Smelter Cities 6–10 when they folded. Butte won the first half championship and Missoula won the second half title. Butte won the overall championship. Helena allegedly forfeited over complaints regarding money and umpiring. Baseball Hall of Fame member Clark Griffith played for Missoula in 1892. It was reported Griffith pitched so well in one game that Missoula fans showered him with gold coins after the game. Griffith later bought property and built a home in Montana.The league did not return to play in 1893.

The Montana State League played a season in 1905. Butte, Great Falls, Helena and Missoula composed the league. No league standings or records are available.

Missoula captured the Union Association championship in 1912.

In 1925, the Montana State League played a final season as a four–team Independent minor league. Butte, Great Falls, Helena and 
Missoula played in the league, which has no official results.

The Timberjacks resumed play as members of the 1956 Class C Pioneer League.

Country singer Charley Pride played for the Timberjacks briefly in 1960.

Today, Missoula is home to the Missoula PaddleHeads, continuing play as members of the Rookie level Pioneer League.

The ballpark
The Timberjacks played at Campbell Field for the duration of their existence. Built in 1947, the original ballpark burned in 1969 and was rebuilt. Campbell Field is still in use today on the campus of the University of Montana.

Timeline

Year-by-Year Record

Notable alumni

Baseball Hall of Fame alumni
Clark Griffith (1892) Inducted, 1946
Jim Kaat (1958) Inducted, 2022; 3x MLB All-Star; 16x Gold Glove

Notable alumni
Cliff Blankenship (1912–1913, MGR)
Pat Bohen (1913)
Bullet Joe Bush (1912)
Bobby Cargo (1892)
Ed Cartwright (1892, MGR)
Lem Cross (1892)
Bert Cueto (1958)
Rex Dawson (1913)
Larry Foss (1957)
Gus Gil (1960)
Bill Goodenough (1892)
Chuck Lauer (1892)
Sheldon Lejeune (1905)
Hap Morse (1913)
Ollie O'Mara (1911)
Jack McKeon (1956–1958, MGR) Manager: 2003 World Series Champion – Florida Marlins
George McVey (1892, MGR)
Minnie Mendoza (1958–1959)
Nig Perrine (1912), (1913, MGR)
Charley Pride (1960)
Skipper Roberts (1912–1913)
Phil Routcliffe (1892)
César Tovar (1960)
Harry Trekell (1913)
Art Twineham (1892)
Sandy Valdespino (1958, 1960)
Jay Ward (1958)
George Whiteman (1911)
Carl Zamloch (1912)

References

External links
Missoula at Baseball-reference.com 

Baseball teams established in 1956
Sports clubs disestablished in 1960
Defunct Pioneer League (baseball) teams
Defunct minor league baseball teams
Professional baseball teams in Montana
Sports in Missoula, Montana
1956 establishments in Montana
1960 disestablishments in Montana
Cincinnati Reds minor league affiliates
Washington Senators minor league affiliates
Defunct sports teams in Montana
Defunct baseball teams in Montana
Baseball teams disestablished in 1960